The Chinese language enjoys the status as official language in Mainland China, Hong Kong, Macau, Singapore and Taiwan, Penghu, Kinmen and Matsu. It is also widely used in Malaysia. However, the language shows a high degree of regional variation among these territories.

Linguistic differences

In many cases, those in China, Hong Kong, Macau, Malaysia, Singapore and Taiwan use different words for the same meaning.

This section seeks to illustrate the differences in vocabulary by a limited selected examples. Note that language used in Hong Kong is almost identical to that of Macau, and that Malaysian vocabulary is identical to Singaporean vocabulary.

See also
 Regional variants of the Mandarin language
 Mainland Mandarin
 Beijing dialect
 Hong Kong written Chinese
 Taiwanese Mandarin
 Malaysian Mandarin
 Singaporean Mandarin
 Regional variants of the Cantonese
 Guangzhou Cantonese
 Hong Kong Cantonese
 Malaysian Cantonese
 Regional variants of the English language
American and British English differences
 American English
 British English
 English English
 Australian English
British and Malaysian English differences
 Regional differences in the Dutch language
Belgian Dutch, Surinamese Dutch
 Regional differences in the French language
Swiss French >> Differences between Swiss French and standard French
 Regional differences in the Korean language
North-South differences in the Korean language
 Regional differences in the Portuguese language
Portuguese dialects >> Differences
European Portuguese
Brazilian Portuguese
 Differences between Malay language (Bahasa Melayu) and Indonesian language (Bahasa Indonesia)
 Comparison of Standard Malay and Indonesian
 Regional Variants of Serbo-croatian
 Serbian language
 Croatian language
 Bosnian language
 (Montenegrin)
 Differences between Chechen Language and Ingush language

References

External links
 兩岸語言詞彙整理之我見　曾榮汾

Chinese language by country
Language comparison
Varieties and styles by language
Language comparison between countries